Handmade Songs (stylized as Handmade Songs by Tori Kelly) is the first extended play (EP) by American singer Tori Kelly. The EP was released on May 1, 2012, through the record label Toraay Records.

The EP was preceded by the single "Confetti".  Handmade Songs by Tori Kelly debuted and peaked at number 9 on the US Top Heatseekers.

Track listing

Release history

Charts

References

2012 debut EPs
Tori Kelly albums